Saint John the Evangelist is a painting by the Flemish artist Michaelina Wautier. It depicts Saint John the Evangelist carrying a chalice, an allusion to the legend that John survived the drinking of a chalice of poison as a demonstration of his faith.  It was painted in the 1650s and is now part of a private collection in Italy.

References 

Paintings by Michaelina Wautier
1650s paintings
Paintings depicting John the Apostle